Trishul is a 1978 Indian Hindi-language masala film, directed by Yash Chopra, written by Salim–Javed and produced by Gulshan Rai. It features music by Mohammed Zahur Khayyam, with lyrics by Sahir Ludhianvi. The film focuses on the intertwined stories of three main characters, portrayed by Shashi Kapoor, Sanjeev Kumar and Amitabh Bachchan.

Trishul was the second-top-grossing Indian film of 1978, after Muqaddar Ka Sikandar, which also starred Amitabh Bachchan and Raakhee. The movie has been remade in Tamil as Mr. Bharath and in Telugu as Mr. Bharath.

Plot
Raj Kumar Gupta (Sanjeev Kumar) gives up his first love Shanti (Waheeda Rehman) to marry a wealthy heiress Kamini (Gita Siddharth), who is the daughter of Seth Dindayal. Shanti comes by to wish him success on his marriage with the news that she is taking his child and moving away. She gives birth to a boy and names him Vijay Kumar (Amitabh Bachchan). She raises him to adulthood. After she dies, Vijay comes to Delhi to take revenge by ruining his father's business and family connections. Shekhar (Shashi Kapoor) and Kusum (Poonam Dhillon) are Vijay's half-siblings who are caught in the crossfire of Vijay's revenge. Vijay crosses paths with Geeta (Raakhee), the devoted secretary R.K. Gupta. He tries to bribe Geeta to get details of Mr. Gupta's business but she declines and the two start to get close with each other. One day Geeta is fired by Gupta as Gupta thinks Geeta has leaked the tender details of his company to Vijay which resulted in Gupta's loss. When Vijay learns about this, he goes to Gupta with the real culprit and hires Geeta in his own company, Shanti Constructions. He gets a lot of success and soon is celebrating company's 2nd Anniversary and keeps a huge party. He invites all big people of the city, specially R.K. Gupta. Here he meets Sheetal Verma (Hema Malini) who is also the daughter of the owner at big he comp and also the romantic interest of Shekhar Gupta. He tries to create differences between Shekhar and Sheetal. Vijay also takes all the good deals which resulted in losses for Raj. He even encourages Kusum to marry Ravi (Sachin) against her father's wishes which enrages Shekhar and he ends up fighting with Vijay. But Geeta comes and tells the truth that they are brothers. Shekhar and Kusum leave Raj. Raj in anger hires Balwant Rai (Prem Chopra) to kill Vijay! Later Vijay comes  and tells him that he is Raj's son and leaves. Raj tries to stop Balwant but he had already left and kidnapped Ravi in order to get to Vijay. Vijay, with the assistance of Shekhar and Raj, rescues Ravi. Balwant aims at Vijay but Raj comes in between and thus Raj is shot in the process by Balwant. Before dying, Raj asks for forgiveness. Vijay forgives him and unites with the family. In addition, Vijay changes the name of his company from Shanti Constructions to Shanti-Raj Constructions.

Cast

 Shashi Kapoor as Shekhar Kumar Gupta
 Sanjeev Kumar as Raj Kumar " R.K." Gupta
 Amitabh Bachchan as Vijay Kumar 
 Raakhee as Geeta
 Hema Malini as Sheetal Verma
 Poonam Dhillon as Kusum Gupta "Babli"
 Sachin as Ravi
 Waheeda Rehman as Shanti (Special Appearance)
 Prem Chopra as Balwant Rai
 Iftekhar as P. L. Verma
 Gita Siddharth as Kamini Gupta
 Manmohan Krishna as Seth Dindayal
 Yunus Parvez as Bhandari
 Mohan Sherry as Gangu
 M. B. Shetty as Madhav Singh
 Manik Irani as  Gangu's Henchman
 Moolchand as Creditor

Credits
Director – Yash Chopra
Producer – Gulshan Rai
Production company – Trimurti Films
Writer – Salim–Javed
Art director – Desh Mukherjee
Chief assistant director – Ramesh Talwar
Editor – B. Mangeshkar
Lyrics – Sahir Ludhianvi
Singers –  Kishore Kumar, Lata Mangeshkar, K. J. Yesudas, Nitin Mukesh & Pamela Chopra

Soundtrack

All the songs were composed by Khayyam and lyrics were penned by Sahir Ludhianvi.

The soundtrack for this movie is credited for bringing the three legends of Indian film music Kishore Kumar, Lata Mangeshkar & K. J. Yesudas together in a single song, "Mohabbat Bade Kaam Ki Cheez Hai".

Reception

Box office
It was declared a "Super Hit" at the box office, becoming the second-top-grossing Indian film of 1978, below Muqaddar Ka Sikandar and above Don.

Overseas in the Soviet Union, the film released in May 1980, with 529 prints.

In terms of footfalls, the film sold an estimated million tickets in India, and  tickets in the Soviet Union, for an estimated total of  tickets sold worldwide.

Awards and nominations
26th Filmfare Awards

Nominations
Best Film – Gulshan Rai
Best Director – Yash Chopra
Best Actor – Amitabh Bachchan
Best Actress – Raakhee
Best Supporting Actor – Sanjeev Kumar
Best Story – Salim–Javed

Legacy
Ziya Us Salam of The Hindu in his review of Yeh Hai Jalwa (2002) called it "a spoof of Trishul".

Popular culture
The movie was heavily referenced in Anurag Kashyap's 2012 crime film Gangs of Wasseypur. A Sinhala film with a similar story line was made with the title Hello Shyama by Director M.S. Anandan, starring Gamini Fonseka in the role of Sanjeev, and Shyama Anandan, daughter of M.S. Anandan, in the role played by Amitabh Bachchan.

References

External links 
 

1970s Hindi-language films
1970s masala films
1978 films
Films directed by Yash Chopra
Films scored by Khayyam
Films with screenplays by Salim–Javed
Hindi films remade in other languages
Indian films about revenge
Trimurti Films
Urdu films remade in other languages
1970s Urdu-language films
Urdu-language Indian films